John V. Mara (March 21, 1908 – June 29, 1965) was a co-owner of the New York Giants, an American football team that plays in the National Football League (NFL). Jack was the son of Elizabeth "Lizette" (née Barclay) and Tim Mara and brother of Wellington, and served as the team's president for 24 years. He and Wellington inherited the team upon their father's death in 1959.

He graduated from Fordham University in 1933 with a law degree. However, he never became a practicing lawyer, instead joining the Giants as team president. In 1934 he married Helen Phelan, daughter of New York State Athletic Commission chairman John J. Phelan. They had two children - Maura and Timothy J. Mara.

Jack Mara died at the age of 57 on June 29, 1965, of cancer at Memorial Hospital. He is buried at the Gate of Heaven Cemetery, Valhalla, New York. He was inducted into the New York Giants Ring of Honor in 2010.

References

External links
 

1908 births
1965 deaths
20th-century American businesspeople
National Football League team presidents
New York Giants executives
New York Giants owners
Sportspeople from New York City
Mara family